The Multicolor Coalition is a big tent political coalition formed for the ballotage in Uruguay in 2019.

It is led by the Uruguayan president Luis Lacalle Pou  and is composed of Lacalle's centre-right National Party (PN),  the centrist Colorado Party (PC), the right-wing Open Cabildo (CA), the centre-left Independent Party (PI), and the right-wing Party of the People (PG).

This alliance competed in the 2019 general elections against the Broad Front (FA). The Luis Lacalle Pou-Beatriz Argimón ticket was elected President of the Republic and Vice President respectively.

History 
In May 2019, the former president of Uruguay, Julio María Sanguinetti expressed himself favouring a political alliance to compete with the ruling party in the general elections. According to the statements, the Colorado Party, the National Party and the Independent Party should be included.

At the beginning of September 2019, the then candidate for the PN, Luis Lacalle Pou, expressed to Argentine businessmen that in Uruguay an alternation in power was taking place in which there would have to be an agreement between "four or five opposition parties", which he later referred to as "Multicolor Coalition". On the night of 27 October, the day the general election was held, after knowing the projections of results, Ernesto Talvi, Guido Manini Ríos and Edgardo Novick announced their support of Lacalle Pou in the second round.

Pablo Mieres said that if certain agreements were reached, his party would support Lacalle Pou, which became official a few days later. On 5 November, the «Commitment for the Country» was presented, a basic document of programmatic agreement between the different parties that make up the Multicolor Coalition.

On 24 November, the election was held, in which Lacalle Pou was victorious against Daniel Martínez (50.79% to 49.21%). The adjusted result, regarding what the voting intention polls marked, prevented from officially knowing the winner on the same night of the election, since the difference that resulted from the primary scrutiny was less than the number of votes observed.

Presidential election 
In the first round held on 27 October, the sum of the votes of the parties that would later integrate the coalition was 1 315 258.29 corresponding to 56.09% of the valid votes. In the second round held on 24 November, the Lacalle Pou-Beatriz Argimón formula received 1 189 313 votes, in this case corresponding to 50.79% of the valid votes, surpassing the Daniel Martínez-Graciela Villar formula in all departments of the country except for Montevideo and Canelones.

Legislative election

Chamber of Representatives

Senate

Members

References 

Political party alliances in Uruguay
2019 establishments in Uruguay
Luis Alberto Lacalle Pou